Alix is a unisex given name. Notable people with the name include:

Royalty
 Alix of France (circa 1151-1197), French princess
 Alix, Duchess of Brittany (1201–1221), Breton child ruler
 Alix of Hesse (1872–1918), Empress consort of Russia
 Alix, Princess Napoléon (born 1926), widow of Louis, Prince Napoléon
 Alix, Princess of Ligne (1929–2019), Luxembourgian princess

Arts
 Alix André (1909-2000), French romance novelist
 Alix Bauer (born 1971), Mexican singer
 Alix Bidstrup (born 1983), Australian actress
 Alix Bosco (21st century), New Zealand crime fiction writer
 Alix Bushnell (born 1983), New Zealand actress
 Alix Combelle (1912–1978), French clarinetist
 Alix Dobkin (1940–2021), American folk singer-songwriter
 Julie Alix de la Fay (circa 1746-1826), Belgian ballet dancer
 Alix Mathon (1908–1985), Haitian novelist
 Alix Olson (born 1975), American poet
 Alix Kates Shulman (born 1932), American novelist
 Alix Smith (born 1978), American photographer
 Alix Wilton Regan (born 1986), English actress

Other
 Alix Bancourt, French blogger
 Alix d'Unienville (1918–2015), British spy
 Alix Grès (1903–1993), also known as Alix or Alix Barton, French fashion designer
 Alix Jamieson (born 1942), Scottish athlete (1964 Olympic Games) 
 Alix Johnson (1946-2002), nickname of Alexandra Uteev Johnson, United States Foreign Service Officer from 1972 to 1979
 Alix Kilroy (1903–1999), British activist
 Alix Klineman (born 1989), American volleyball player
 Alix Liddell (1907–1981), Officer of the Order of the British Empire
 Alix de Montmorency (died circa 1220), countess in the Peerage of England
 Alix Pasquet, (1919–1958), Haitian World War II fighter pilot
 Alix Perez, Belgian DJ
 Alix Popham (born 1979), Welsh rugby union footballer
 Alix Potet, French professor

Unisex given names

pl:Alicja